HMS Lydiard  was a  built for the Royal Navy during the 1910s.

Description
The Laforey class were improved and faster versions of the preceding . They displaced . Lydiard was powered by two Brown-Curtis direct-drive steam turbines, each driving one propeller shaft, using steam provided by four Yarrow boilers. The ships' complement was 74 officers and ratings.

The ships were armed with three single QF  Mark IV guns and two QF 1.5-pounder (37 mm) anti-aircraft guns. These latter guns were later replaced by a pair of QF 2-pounder (40 mm) "pom-pom" anti-aircraft guns. The ships were also fitted with two above-water twin mounts for  torpedoes.

Construction and service
The ship was ordered as Waverley from Fairfield Shipbuilding and Engineering Company as part of the 1912–13 programme, but was renamed Lydiard before being launched on 26 February 1914. She served with the 3rd Destroyer Flotilla, and fought at the Battle of Heligoland Bight in 1914, where she was credited with torpedoing the German light cruiser .

She was transferred to escort duties after 1917, and sold for breaking in November 1921.

Notes

Bibliography
 Campbell, John. Jutland: An Analysis of the Fighting. London: Conway Maritime Press, 1998. .

External links 

 Battle of Jutland Crew Lists Project - HMS Lydiard Crew List

 

Laforey-class destroyers (1913)
Ships built on the River Tyne
1914 ships
World War I destroyers of the United Kingdom